The Spring Football League (SFL) was a short lived professional american football minor league that existed for only one season in 2000.

Spring football
Founded by several ex-NFL players such as Eric Dickerson, Drew Pearson, Bo Jackson, and Tony Dorsett, the SFL planned to use the four-game mini-season (dubbed "Festival 2000") to test cities, fans, stadiums, the media, entertainment, and springtime American football as a product. The year before, the Regional Football League staggered through a spring season, then announced it would not return for 2000.

In late 1999, the SFL announced an inaugural season of 2000, with ten individually-owned teams playing a 12-week schedule, followed by a championship game during Memorial Day weekend. Mark Rice, chairman of the SFL board of governors, placed eight of the franchises in Birmingham; Canton, Ohio; Houston; Jackson, Mississippi; Los Angeles; Miami; San Antonio and Washington, D.C. On March 1, 2000, the SFL announced the league had scaled down to four teams that would play four-game schedules on Saturdays from April 29, followed by a championship game in Miami on May 27.

Teams

SFL teams consisted of 38 players, each of whom would receive $1,200 per game with a $200 winners bonus.

The league's games included pre-game and half-time shows featuring national musical acts (such as The O'Jays, Mark Wills, and Poncho Sanchez), a pronounced effort to attract both African-Americans and Latino fans, and innovative use of wireless communication.

SFL coaches of note:

 Lew Carpenter – Green Bay Packers
 Guy McIntyre – San Francisco 49ers
 Doug Cosbie – Dallas Cowboys
 Keith Millard – Minnesota Vikings
 Jim Jensen – Miami Dolphins
 Hugh Green – Miami Dolphins
 David Little – Pittsburgh Steelers
 Neal Colzie – Oakland Raiders
 Donald Hollas – Oakland Raiders
 Don Narcisse – Saskatchewan Roughriders

Mini-season cut short
The Spring Football League suffered from a distinct lack of media attention: newspaper coverage was spotty at best, and the SFL had no radio or TV contracts (although some games were apparently carried on the internet). Attendance was disastrously low, despite some very competitive contests; only 1,100 people showed up at the one game played at cavernous Los Angeles Coliseum. The SFL wasn't even able to finish out its modest, one-month season—league officials ended the test program after only two weeks and four games. Houston and San Antonio, both with 2–0 records, were declared league co-champions.

The SFL planned to return in 2001 with at least eight teams. However, with funding for the league having been provided by tech-stock entrepreneurs, any chance that the SFL would return was scotched by the tech-market crash of 2000 and the subsequent announcement of the XFL by the WWF.

The last professional football game played at the Miami Orange Bowl was an SFL game: a crowd estimated at "less than a thousand" watched on April 29, 2000 as the San Antonio Matadors defeated the Miami Tropics, 16-14.

References

External links
 CBS highlight of Houston Marshals vs Miami Tropics via YouTube
 "Remember the SFL"

Defunct American football leagues in the United States